or  (lit. "Whale Island") is an island in Tromsø Municipality in Troms og Finnmark county, Norway. At , it is the fifth largest island in mainland Norway. It is connected to the neighboring island of Tromsøya to the east by the Sandnessund Bridge, to the island of Ringvassøya to the north by the sub-sea Kvalsund Tunnel, to the small island of Sommarøya to the west by the Sommarøy Bridge, and to the mainland to the south by the Rya Tunnel. The island of Sommarøy, on the southwest coast, is a popular recreation area with magnificent coastal scenery.

Geography 

There are also several small fjords, almost dividing the island in two or three parts: Kaldfjorden, Ersfjorden, and Kattfjorden.

The Rystraumen is a tidal current in the Straumsfjorden strait separating Kvaløya from the mainland to the south. Near this current, on the Kvaløya side, is Straumhella ( from the city), a popular recreation area with good fishing opportunities.

Ryøya is an island in the midst of Rystraumen, formerly home to a small population of musk oxen that lived in the pine forest. The last musk ox, known as Alma, was discovered dead in 2013; an autopsy revealed that she had plastic in her stomach. Someone had left the rings of a beer six-pack behind on the island and Alma was found to have eaten them.

Demography 
Approximately 13,000 people live on Kvaløya, most of them on the eastern side near Kvaløysletta (which constitutes a suburban area of the city of Tromsø) near the Sandnessund Bridge.

Climate 
According to official climate statistics, the west coast of Kvaløya, facing the open ocean, is the warmest part of Tromsø municipality.

Media gallery

See also
List of islands of Norway

References

External links 
Climbing Store Blåmann - information and pictures
Spaceweather.com - picture of spectacular aurora borealis above Kvaløya fjord Feb 15 2010
37 kg cod caught on fishing rod near Kvaløya
https://www.independent.co.uk - image of Northern Lights seen through the boreal forest of Kvaløya

Tromsø
Islands of Troms og Finnmark